Rafael Limón Burgos, also known as Bazooka Limón (born 13 January 1954) is a Mexican former professional boxer who held the WBC super featherweight title twice between 1980 and 1982. He also challenged for the same title in 1979 and 1983.

Biography
Born on 13 January 1954, Limón did not know who his father was. He thought his father was a soldier who lived with his mother, woman who had three sons, including Rafael, and one daughter. The soldier had alcoholic problems and beat up Limon's mom. Limon's mother moved with her children to Mexico City when Limon was 4; and when he was 15, Limon came to meet his real father in a strange way: walking on the street one day, Limon was confronted by a man who tried snatching his purse. He punched the man and ran back home. The man then followed him and arrived at Limon's family's house a couple of minutes behind Limon, and then Limon's mother introduced them as biological father and son.

Later on, Limon, like the man who had been his father figure, joined the Mexican Army on February 14, 1972. Limon witnessed some friends boxing and was challenged by an on duty major to fight after he saw a friend get bloodied and found that funny. Limon found out he had talent for the sport and was sent to train with former professional boxer and noted trainer Kid Rapidez after three months learning to box while with the Army.

Boxing career
Limon is best known for his four-bout rivalry with Bobby Chacon. Their first fight took place on 7 December 1975, in Mexicali, Mexico, Limón defeating a heavily favoured Chacon in a ten-round unanimous decision (UD).

Negotiations took place in 1977–78 to pit Limón against WBA super featherweight champion, Samuel Serrano. However, the fight never took place.

Limón challenged WBC super featherweight  champion Alexis Argüello in February 1979, suffering an eleventh-round knockout (KO). Following this he and Chacon met for the second time, an accidental clash of heads resulting in a seven-round technical draw (TD). The pair met for a third time on 21 March 1980, in Los Angeles, Chacon earning a 10-round split decision (SD).

In spite of this Limón found himself fighting later that year for the world title Arguello had vacated. Limón knocked out Venezuela's Idelphonso Bethelmy in the fifteenth round at Los Angeles to become the WBC super featherweight champion.

Limon made his first defense against England-based Ugandan Cornelius Boza-Edwards, losing a fifteen-round unanimous decision.

In 1982, Rolando Navarrete was the WBC super featherweight champion, having dethroned Boza-Edwards by fifth-round KO. Limón knocked Navarrete out in round twelve to become a two-time world champion.

After defending his title successfully against Chung Il Choi, Limón met Bobby Chacon for a fourth bout. Held on 11 December 1982 in Sacramento. It was their first meeting with a world championship at stake. Limón dropped Chacón in rounds three and ten, but Chacon turned the tables with only a few seconds left in round fifteen and knocked Limón down. Limón climbed the ropes to get to his feet to finish the fight, yet lost on the judges' cards in a close unanimous decision.

In 1983, Chacón refused to defend his world title against Héctor 'Macho' Camacho, so Limón traveled to Puerto Rico to meet Camacho. He was no match for Camacho, who defeated him in five rounds.

Limón went on boxing until 1992, losing to a number of future world champions and prominent boxers, including Julio César Chávez and Sharmba Mitchell, but never again challenged for a world title.

His record is 52-23-2 (39 KOs).

See also
List of WBC world champions
List of Mexican boxing world champions
List of left-handed boxers

References

External links 
 

1954 births
Living people
Boxers from Tlaxcala
World Boxing Council champions
Mexican male boxers
Lightweight boxers
Mexican soldiers